Beaver Lake is located north of Morehouseville, New York. Fish species present in the lake are brook trout, brown trout, white sucker, black bullhead, and pumpkinseed sunfish. There is a carry down access on the northeast shore off trail. No motors are allowed on this lake.

References

Lakes of New York (state)
Lakes of Hamilton County, New York